The Nanchang–Ganzhou high-speed railway, or Changgan Passenger Dedicated Line, is a high-speed railway between Nanchang and Ganzhou in Jiangxi province. The southern section of that railway, the Ganzhou–Shenzhen high-speed railway, commenced construction in January 2015. This allows for fast connections from Jiangxi to several coastal cities in Guangdong and Fujian.

Construction work began on December 20, 2014, between Nanchang and Ji'an.

References 

High-speed railway lines in China
Rail transport in Jiangxi
Standard gauge railways in China
Railway lines opened in 2019